Jahanzeb Khan is a Pakistani television actor, model and singer. He started his career with modeling. Khan made his television debut with a supporting role in ARY Digital's famous soap-opera Mehmoodabad Ki Malkain.

Early life and education
Jahanzeb Khan was born to a Muslim Pashtun family in Hyderabad, Pakistan. He studied computer programming at Sindh University.

Career
Khan started acting with famous theater group of Sheema Kirmani. He made his television debut with a minor role in muthech popular soap opera Mehmoodabad Ki Malkain. 

Khan is a trained dancer and a model as well. 

He has appeared in almost a dozen dramas and almost all of them have been hits. In a list published by Reviewit.pk, he was called one of the finest Male Supporting Actors of Pakistan.

Filmography

Telefilms

Films

Dramas

References

External links 
 
 
 

1985 births
Living people